William Earl Kilson (born August 2, 1962) is an American jazz drummer.

Kilson was born in Washington, D.C.. He started on trumpet at ten, switched to trombone at 11, then to drums at 16. He studied at the Berklee College of Music from 1980 to 1985 and took private lessons from Alan Dawson during 1982–89. Following this he did a tour of Europe with Walter Davis.

He has played with Ahmad Jamal (1989), Dianne Reeves (1989–95), Greg Osby (1991), George Duke (1991–98), Steps Ahead (1993), Tim Hagans (1993 and subsequently), Terumasa Hino (1994–98), Bob James (1995 and subsequently), Dave Holland (since 1997), Bob Belden (1997) and Kevin Mahogany (1998). Other associations include Kirk Whalum, Freddie Jackson, Chris Botti, Donald Brown, Bob James, and Paula Cole.

Kilson is perhaps best known for his work with Holland. He plays on Holland's Grammy Award-nominated 1999 album Prime Directive and his Grammy-winning 2002 release What Goes Around.

Kilson has also led his own quartet ensemble along with James Genus and Tim Hagans. His debut release as a leader, Pots and Pans, appeared in 2006.

Discography
 Pots & Pans (Arintha Star, 2006)
 Descension Rising (2016)

As sideman
With Greg Osby
 Man-Talk for Moderns Vol. X (Blue Note Records, 1991)

With Bob Belden
 Princejazz (Somethin' Else, 1994)
 Purple Rain (Somethin' Else, 1994)
 When Doves Cry (Metro Blue, 1994)
 Tapestry (Jazz Heritage, 1998)
 Black Dahlia (Blue Note, 2001)

With Chris Botti
 When I Fall in Love (Columbia, 2004)
 To Love Again (Columbia, 2005)
 In Boston (Decca, 2009)

With Carla Cook
 It's All About Love (MAXJAZZ, 1999)
 Dem Bones (MAXJAZZ, 2001)
 Simply Natural (MAXJAZZ, 2002)

With Michael Franks
 Watching the Snow (Koch, 2003)
 Time Together (Shanachie, 2011)
 The Music in My Head (P-Vine, 2018)

With Tim Hagans
 Audible Architecture (Blue Note, 1995)
 Animation Imagination (Blue Note, 1999)
 Re-Animation Live! (Blue Note, 1999)

With Dave Holland
 Points of View (ECM, 1998)
 Prime Directive  (ECM, 1999)
 Not for Nothin' ECM, 2001)
 What Goes Around  (ECM, 2002)
 Extended Play: Live at Birdland (ECM, 2003)
 Overtime (Dare2, 2004)

With Bob James
 Joy Ride (Warner Bros., 1999)
 Take It from the Top (Koch, 2004)
  Urban Flamingo (Koch, 2006)
 Espresso (Evosound, 2018)
 Joined at the Hip (Evosound, 2019)

With Dianne Reeves
 I Remember (Blue Note, 1991)
 Art & Survival (EMI, 1994)
 Quiet After the Storm (Blue Note, 1994)

With others
 Spyro Gyra, The Deep End (Heads Up, 2004)
 Johnny Adams, The Verdict (Rounder, 1995)
 Philip Bailey, Soul On Jazz (Heads Up, 2002)
 Walter Beasley, Walter Beasley (Polydor, 1987)
 Terence Blanchard, Simply Stated (Columbia, 1992)
 Donald Brown, At This Point in My Life (Space Time, 2001)
 Tom Browne, R'N'Browne (Hip Bop, 1999)
 Larry Carlton, Deep Into It (Warner Bros., 2001)
 Larry Carlton, Sapphire Blue (Bluebird, 2003)
 Larry Carlton and Tak Matsumoto, "Take Your Pick" (335 Records, 2010) *Grammy Winner 
 Billy Childs, Portrait of a Player (Windham Hill, 1993)
 Paula Cole, Courage (Decca, 2007)
 Continuum, Act One (Space Time, 2004)
 Taylor Eigsti, Lucky to Be Me (Concord Jazz, 2006)
 Robin Eubanks, Klassik Rock Vol. 1 (ArtistShare, 2014)
 Bill Evans, Escape (Escapade Music, 1996)
 Michael Gibbs, Nonsequence (Provocateur,)
 Great Jazz Trio, Blue Minor (Eighty-Eight's, 2008)
 Antonio Hart, All We Need (Downtown Sound, 2004)
 Terumasa Hino-Masabumi Kikuchi Quintet, Acoustic Boogie (Somethin' Else, 1995)
 Terumasa Hino-Masabumi Kikuchi Quintet, Moment (Somethin' Else, 1996)
 Joe Locke, State of Soul (Sirocco, 2002)
 Kevin Mahogany, My Romance (Warner Bros., 1998)
 Andy McKee, Sound Roots (Mapleshade, 1997)
 Bill Mobley, Mean What You Say (Space Time, 1999)
 Maria Muldaur, Jazzabelle (Stony Plain, 1993)
 Austin Peralta, Maiden Voyage (Eighty-Eight's, 2006)
 Lonnie Plaxico, Rhythm & Soul (Sirocco, 2003)
 Josh Roseman, Treats for the Nightwalker (Enja, 2003)
 Spyro Gyra, The Deep End (Heads Up, 2004)
 John Stoddart, Wings to Walk This Road (Reprise, 2003)
 Steve Wilson, Soulful Song (MAXJAZZ, 2003)
 Yo-Yo Ma, Songs of Joy & Peace (Sony Classical, 2008)

References

Billy Kilson at Modern Drummer
Mark Gilbert, "Billy Kilson". Grove Jazz online.

American jazz drummers
Musicians from Washington, D.C.
Living people
Berklee College of Music alumni
1962 births
20th-century American drummers
American male drummers
20th-century American male musicians
American male jazz musicians